The Sandomierzacy are a subethnic group of the Polish nation, who reside in the historic province of Lesser Poland, around the town of Sandomierz. They use their own dialect, which belongs to Lesser Polish dialect of the Polish language. Like most Poles, the Sandomierzacy are Roman Catholics. 

The Sandomierzacy proper reside along the left bank of the Vistula river, reaching Ilza and Skaryszew in the north, and Checiny in the west. They also live southeast of Sandomierz, in former Austrian Galicia. Together with the Krakowiacy, the Sandomierzacy are the oldest ethnic group of Lesser Poland. In the 19th century, when Lesser Poland was for over 100 years divided between the Habsburg Empire and the Russian Empire, the Sandomierzacy were under the influence of Mazovia, which resulted in several changes, mostly in their traditional clothing.

Borowiacy Sandomierscy  
The Borowiacy sandomierscy is a small subethnic group of Sandomierzacy, which resides along right bank of the San river, in forested areas of Janow Lubelski.

Posaniacy  
The Posaniacy is another subethnicy group of the Sandomierzacy. They inhabited the Sandomierz Forest, and in the 19th century, most of them settled in forests around Radom.

Sources  
 Encyklopedia Polski. wyd. Wydawnictwo Ryszard Kluszczynski, Kraków 1996.

See also 
 Świętokrzyskie cuisine
 Lesser Poland

Ethnic groups in Poland
Polish traditions
Polish culture
Świętokrzyskie Voivodeship